Sabbione is an Italian surname. Notable people with the surname include:
Alberto Sabbione (born 1948), Argentine field hockey player
Alessio Sabbione (born 1991), Italian footballer
Jorge Sabbione (born 1948), Argentine field hockey player

See also 
 , province of Reggio Emilia, Italy
 , lake in Verbano-Cusio-Ossola, Piemonte, Italy
 Punta del Sabbione